Victor Joseph Gatto (born 1893 New York City, died 1965 Miami) was an American primitive artist.

References

1893 births
1965 deaths